Orders, decorations and medals of South Ossetia is a system of awards of the Republic of South Ossetia established in 2007. Decorations are divided into two grades: orders and medals, and the medals can be divided between state awards and departmental awards.

Orders

Medals

Gallery

See also 
Orders, decorations, and medals of Abkhazia

References 

Orders, decorations, and medals of country subdivisions